Vanessa Williams (born March 18, 1963) is an American actress and singer.  In 1983, she became the first African–American woman to win the title of Miss America (Miss America 1984). Williams was forced to resign a few weeks prior to the end of her reign on July 22, 1984 due to a scandal surrounding the publication of unauthorized nude photographs in  Penthouse magazine. After her resignation as Miss America in 1984, Williams rebounded with a successful career in the entertainment industry. She  is the recipient of a number of awards and nominations including  Grammy nominations for hits such as "The Right Stuff," "Save the Best for Last," and "Colors of the Wind." In addition, she has earned multiple Emmy nominations, a Tony Award nomination, 7 NAACP Image Awards, and 4  Satellite Awards.

She received a star on the  Hollywood Walk of Fame on March 19, 2007.

Music

Grammy Awards
Williams has received eleven Grammy nominations without a win.

 Williams has featured on three albums nominated for the Grammy for Best Musical Show Album, these nominations being credited to the respective producers, engineers and composers and not to the artists.
 "Save the Best for Last" was also nominated for Song of the Year. As this award only goes to the songwriters, Williams was not nominated. The composers were Wendy Waldman, Jon Lind and Phil Galdstone.
 Williams' recording of "You Can't Run" was nominated for the Grammy for Best R&B Song. As this is a songwriters award the nomination went to the song's composer, Babyface.
 "Colors of the Wind" won Best Song Written for Visual Media. As this award only goes to the songwriters, Williams was not nominated. The composers were Alan Menken and Stephen Schwartz.

Additional awards and nominations

 The song "Colors of the Wind", performed by Vanessa Williams at the end of the film Pocahontas, won the Academy Award for Best Original Song. This award goes to the song's composers (Alan Menken and Stephen Schwartz). The song was performed in the film by Judy Kuhn as the singing voice of the title character.

Pageants and acting

Miss America 1984

Primetime Emmy Awards

Tony Awards

Satellite Awards

Screen Actors Guild Awards

Additional awards  and nominations

References

External links

she also won 6 awards regarding to her music as well as entertainment

Awards
Lists of awards received by American actor
Williams, Vanessa